Digitivalvopsis paradoxa is a moth of the family Acrolepiidae. It was described by Sigeru Moriuti in 1982. It is found in Japan and the Russian Far East.

The wingspan is about 10 mm.

References

Acrolepiidae
Monotypic moth genera
Moths of Japan
Moths of Asia